Polyacanthia strandi is a species of beetle in the family Cerambycidae. It was described by Stephan von Breuning in 1939. It is known from Australia.

It is 12.5 mm long and 4.5 mm wide, and its type locality is Tamborine Mountain, Queensland. It was named in honor of Embrik Strand, in whose Festschrift the species description was written.

References

Pogonocherini
Beetles described in 1939
Taxa named by Stephan von Breuning (entomologist)